Asterisk* (formerly PMS Asterisk) was an all-female Esports organization based in Singapore. It was established in 2004 as the first all-female team competing in both DotA and Dota 2. The organization led the Asian division for PMS Clan, the world's largest female multi-platform online gaming group on Xbox, PC and PlayStation platforms. In 2015, Asterisk* was relaunched as an Events, Talent Management and Consultant for gaming related projects.

History 
Asterisk* was co-founded in 2004 by Dawn "pinksheep*" Yang and Tammy "furryfish*" Tang. The team's first official event was at the 2005 World Cyber Games Grand Finals in Singapore, where the team claimed victory at the event's stage showcase match. Named by retired player Tan "flawed*" Lishan, "Asterisk*" symbolizes the meeting of different personalities and minds, coming together to deliver a stellar performance.

Since its inauguration, the team has been featured on magazines, leading Esports portals, and television.

The team makes a regular appearance at Thailand's annual games convention, the Electronic Sports Thailand Championship. They also actively participate in local and regional tournaments, conventions, and forum panel discussions.

In March 2010, Asterisk* added a new team to the PMS Asia roster, formerly known as Mineski Girls, led by Rea Lynne "Rheadoo" Aguinaldo. The team was then renamed ""PMSki"", joining the main team at regional events. 

In 2013, the Asterisk* League of Legends sub-unit was formed.

Team roster 
Asterisk's roster includes Tammy "furryfish*" Tang, Kimberlyn "Kimchi*" See, Eliza "MsJovial*" Ong, Cynthia "w4ndeRz-*" Santa Maria, and Hua Yan "Yan*" Ng . Recently the team added 2 well known international players from Thailand to their roster, namely Siraya "Pinkle" Sunpanich and Tao "Greenbean" Meta as well as 2 new girls from their 2013 trials, Esther "Umiisukii*" Lua and Mary "marypot*".

Team members 
Tammy "furryfish*" Tang Zhao En (born 6 October 1984) is the current leader and founder of Team Asterisk*. She is also the current leader of PMS Asia. She goes by the alias "furryfish*" on the Steam gaming platform. Her gaming days started with all-girls Counter-Strike team [Elm]-Lf- in 1999, where the team clinched titles in all-male divisions. After switching to DotA, Tammy also picked up Granado Espada, World of Warcraft and Starcraft 2. In addition to gaming, Tammy is also accomplished in sports and holds national medals in sailing and gymnastics. She attended the prestigious Raffles Girls School and Raffles Junior College in Singapore and went on to earn her degree at the National University of Singapore, majoring in geography. In her pastime, she enjoys fishing, floorball, reading and polishing her skills in the Japanese language. Currently, Tammy is a Marketing Manager at a local gaming firm. She also writes on her personal blog.

Cynthia "w4ndeRz-*" Santa Maria (born 4 January 1987) is the spokesperson of Team Asterisk*. She is also the co-leader of PMS Asia. She goes by the alias "w4ndeRz*" on gaming platforms. Cynthia graduated with a Bachelor of Commerce from the University of Queensland in Australia and is currently a Priority Banker at DBS Bank.

Kimberlyn "kimchi*" See Ee Hua (born 22 September 1991) is the commander and strategist of Team Asterisk*. Known for her aggressive play style, she excels in other games such as Jubeat and Beatmania IIDX. Kimberlyn graduated from Singapore Polytechnic in Media and Communications and is currently an Air Stewardess with Singapore Airlines. In her free time, she likes going to the movies, playing mahjong as well as owning at the arcade.

Eliza "MsJovial*" Ong Jie Zhi (born 27 June 1990) usually plays the role of hard carry for Asterisk*, and goes by the alias "MsJovial*" on gaming platforms. Known for her modeling career, she is also a talented singer, having produced many song covers which are posted on her Facebook as well as on YouTube.

Huayan "Yan*" Ng (born 29 December 1990) rejoined Asterisk* after finding time out of her new job as an Air Stewardess with Singapore Airlines. Famous for being witty and out of the box ideas, she brings crazy ideas to the team drafts.

A player who goes by the username of "dhazibi*" is also a member of Asterisk*.

Notable retired players include Dawn "pinksheep*" Yang, Lishan "shan*" Tan, Cheryl "sheRicA*" Kong, and trainee Eliza "chEwy*" Tan.

In 2013, Asterisk* acquired up a League of Legends team consisting of players Rachell "Foxy*" Hyori, Jeslyn "Claria*" Kweh, Valerie "Aya*" Seng, Cici "Sundae*" Chen and Shuwen "Auvielle*" Yeow, with Jolene "Lustreless*" Poh acting as team captain.

Sponsorships 
Asterisk* is sponsored by SteelSeries and Alienware. The ladies are spokespeople for the Cyber Wellness campaign in Singapore, as a partner of Singapore's Cybersports & Online Gaming Association (SCOGA) and are campaigning for the recognition of Esports as an official sport in Singapore.

Media appearances 
Asterisk* was invited to appear on SteelSeries' widely acclaimed reality gaming show, IronLady III which was held in Shanghai in 2010. The show was broadcast across China on NeoTV and to the world on NeoTV's website. The team was subsequently interviewed by the top gaming magazine in China and also made the front page of myMYM news.

Other key media appearances in 2010 include an interview by Singapore's leading newspaper Straits Times in an article titled "New Game Queens" featuring the girls at their home base. Dawn "pinksheep" Yang was also interviewed on two occasions by The Straits Times on Razor TV where she shared what it takes to be a competitive gamer, juggling work, life and gaming; and in Straits Times bookends, where she shared her preferred reads.

In 2009, Asterisk* was also featured on StarHub in a documentary on Cyber Wellness. In the program, the ladies shared how they balanced life and gaming, as well as a few cool tips for girl gamer wannabes.

In 2008, the team appeared on Malaysia's 8tv live show, Quickie, as a post-SMM Grand National DOTA Competition feature in Kuala Lumpur.

In 2007, leader Tammy "furryfish" Tang was also featured in "Shifting Perspectives", a documentary discussing the changing landscape of gaming. This was broadcast on Singapore's leading news channel, Channel NewsAsia, which aired on 21 November 2007 at 8:30 pm. The documentary was produced by The Right Angle.

In 2006, Cynthia "w4ndeRz-" Santa Maria was interviewed and featured on "Get Real", a current affairs program discussing her gaming habits. This was broadcast on Singapore's leading news channel, Channel NewsAsia, airing in August 2006.

Achievements

Event appearances

References

External links 
 

2004 establishments in Singapore
Esports teams based in Singapore
Esports teams established in 2004
Dota teams
Defunct and inactive League of Legends teams